Abbas Miski (Arabic: عباس مسكي; born 25 July 1995) is a Lebanese international rugby league footballer who plays as a er for the Wigan Warriors in the Super League.

He previously played for the Manly-Warringah Sea Eagles in the NRL, and the North Sydney Bears and the Blacktown Workers Sea Eagles in the Canterbury Cup NSW competition. Miski has also spent time on loan from Wigan at the Newcastle Thunder in the Betfred Championship.

Background
Miski was born in Penrith, New South Wales, Australia, the son of Lebanese immigrants to Australia. He is a Muslim.

Miski played junior rugby league for the Arncliffe Scots and the Kingsgrove Colts. He played S. G. Ball Cup for St. George, represented Lebanon at under-18 level in 2013, and played for the Parramatta Eels in the National Youth Competition in 2015, scoring 12 tries in 24 matches.

Playing career

2016-2018

Miski joined the North Sydney Bears in the New South Wales Cup in 2016.

After two seasons with Norths, Miski left the club as he was not included in the 2018 Intrust Super Premiership NSW squad.

In 2018, Miski joined the Wentworthville Magpies. On 22 September 2018, Miski scored a try for Wentworthville in their 38-4 victory over St Marys in the Ron Massey Cup grand final.

2019
In 2019, Miski signed for the Blacktown Workers Sea Eagles, the feeder team for the Manly Warringah Sea Eagles after being released by Wentworthville.  Miski made an appearance for Manly at Central Coast Stadium against the Sydney Roosters in the Community Cup scoring 3 tries in a trial match.

On 4 May 2019, Miski made his first grade debut on the wing for Manly against Canterbury-Bankstown at Brookvale Oval with Manly winning the game 18-10.  Miski was called into the first grade team after winger Jorge Taufua pulled out with an ankle injury.

Miski spent most of 2019 playing for Manly's feeder club side the Blacktown Workers Sea Eagles.  Miski finished the 2019 season as the club's top try scorer with 12 tries.  Despite Miski's efforts on the field, Blacktown Workers finished with the wooden spoon coming last with only 6 wins all season.

2020
In round 20 of the 2020 NRL season, Miski was called into the Manly-Warringah side for their final match of the year against the New Zealand Warriors. Miski scored two tries in a 40-28 loss at the Central Coast Stadium.

On 31 December 2020 it was announced that he had signed for the London Broncos in the Betfred Championship for the 2021 season.

2021
On 19 July 2021, it was announced that Miski would join Wigan in 2022 on a two-year contract (with an option for a third).

2022
In round 4 of the 2022 Super League season, Miski made his club debut for Wigan against Toulouse Olympique which ended in a 29-28 victory.
In round 16 of the 2022 Super League season, Miski scored four tries for Wigan in a 40-6 win over Toulouse Olympique.

International career
Miski made his debut for Lebanon in their 2014 Hayne/Mannah Cup match against  on 19 October 2014. On 4 August 2017, he was named in Lebanon's 40-man training squad for the 2017 World Cup.  Miski played on the wing for Lebanon during the 2017 World Cup playing in all four games. Before the third pool game against , Miski garnered media attention for his almost mirror image look of Australian winger Josh Mansour. In the quarter final against Tonga, Miski scored two tries in Lebanon's narrow loss which ended 24-22.
At the 2021 Rugby League World Cup, Miski scored a try in the first group stage match against New Zealand in which Lebanon lost 34-12. In the final group stage game, Miski scored two tries against minnows Jamaica as Lebanon won the match 74-12.

References

External links

Manly Sea Eagles profile
North Sydney Bears profile
Parramatta Eels profile
NRL profile
2017 RLWC profile

1995 births
Living people
Australian Muslims
Australian rugby league players
Australian people of Lebanese descent
Lebanon national rugby league team players
London Broncos players
Manly Warringah Sea Eagles players
Newcastle Thunder players
North Sydney Bears NSW Cup players
Rugby league centres
Rugby league players from Penrith, New South Wales
Rugby league wingers
Wentworthville Magpies players
Wigan Warriors players